Bennett's Hole is a 1.2 hectare Local Nature Reserve in Mitcham in the London Borough of Merton. According to the Natural England details page about the site, it is owned by Merton Council and managed by the council and London Wildlife Trust, but it is not shown on the Trust's list of reserves.

The reserve is a narrow strip along the east bank of the River Wandle. It has areas of woodland, marsh, scrub and an open ditch. Trees include crack willow and oak, and there is a variety of tall herbs. There is access from Willow Lane.

References

Local nature reserves in Greater London
Nature reserves in the London Borough of Merton
London Wildlife Trust